is a private junior college in Tatebayashi, Gunma, Japan, established in 1950. The predecessor of the school was founded in 1924. The school is affiliated with the Kanto Gakuen University, located in Ōta, Gunma. The school currently specializes only in children's education, providing licensed accreditation for kindergarten and nursery school teachers.

External links
  Official website 

Educational institutions established in 1924
Private universities and colleges in Japan
Universities and colleges in Gunma Prefecture
Japanese junior colleges
Tatebayashi, Gunma
1924 establishments in Japan